is a song by Super Monkey's, released as the second single under the moniker Super Monkey 4, and their third single in total. The b-side to the single is yet another Namie Amuro solo, "Wagamama wo Yurushite." The title track first appeared in a chewing gum commercial before the release of their second single, "Dancing Junk" (1993).

Commercial endorsements
The a-side was used in commercials for Lotte Mascot Gum which starred the group. One commercial was shot while their original group leader, Anna Makino, was still a part of the group. A second commercial featuring the remaining members playing soccer aired during the release of the single.

Track listing
All lyrics are written by Neko Oikawa; all music is composed and arranged by Minoru Komorita.

Personnel
Namie Amuro - vocals, background vocals
Hisako Arakaki - background vocals
Minako Ameku - background vocals
Nanako Takushi - background vocals

Charts
Oricon Sales Chart (Japan)

1993 singles
1993 songs
Super Monkey's songs
Songs with lyrics by Neko Oikawa